The 1977 NAIA Men's Ice Hockey Tournament involved eight schools playing in single-elimination bracket to determine the national champion of men's NAIA college ice hockey. The 1977 tournament was the tenth men's ice hockey tournament to be sponsored by the NAIA.   The tournament began on February 25, 1977 and ended with the championship game on February 27, 1977.

Bracket
Wessman Arena, Superior, Wisconsin

Note: * denotes overtime period(s)
Note: # Ferris State replaced Hillsdale College, who turned down the invitation due to cost of attending the tournament

References

External links 
 NAIA ice hockey

Ice
NAIA Men's Ice Hockey Championship
NAIA Ice Hockey Championship 
NAIA Ice Hockey Championship
NAIA Ice Hockey Championship